The International Chamber of Shipping is one of the world's principal shipping organisations, representing around 80% of the world's merchant tonnage through membership by national shipowners' associations. It is concerned with maritime regulatory, operational and legal issues. Its membership includes over 40 national shipowner organisations.

A major ICS activity is acting as a consultative body at the United Nations agency with responsibility for the safety of life at sea and the protection of the marine environment, the International Maritime Organization. ICS represents the global interests of all the different shipping trades in the industry, these include bulk carrier operators, tanker operators, passenger ship operators and container liner trades, including shipowners and third party ship managers.

ICS has consultative status with a number of other intergovernmental bodies which affect shipping, these include: the World Customs Organization, the International Telecommunication Union, the United Nations Conference on Trade and Development, and the World Meteorological Organization. The ICS also has close relationships with industry organisations representing different maritime interests such as shipping, ports, pilotage, the oil industry, insurance and classification societies responsible for the surveying of ships.

History
ICS was established in 1921.

Location
In September 2021, the International Chamber of Shipping left office space near the Baltic Exchange in St Mary Axe and moved to Walsingham House near to Tower Hill.

Publications
The ICS is also responsible for several publications in use in the marine industry, in conjunction with Witherbys. In June 2020, ICS made its maritime publications available as e-books for the first time.

In response to IMO efforts to require cyber security to be addressed under the International Safety Management Code, in November 2019, together with BIMCO and the Witherby Publishing Group, ICS published the Cyber Security Workbook for Onboard Ship Use. The second edition of the nautical workbook was published in 2021.

In May 2020, ICS issued updated health guidance for the global shipping industry to ensure ship operators and crew can safely deal with seafarers struggling with medical conditions during the COVID-19 pandemic.

In 2021, ICS produced guidance on Maritime security with a publication entitled Maritime Security - A comprehensive Guide for Shipowners, Seafarers and Administrations.

In August 2022, in partnership with Witherbys and BIMCO, ICS issued a guidance title for the shipping industry on biofouling entitled Biofouling, Biosecurity and Hull Cleaning.

See also 
 European Community Shipowners' Associations (Brussels) 
 International Maritime Organization (London; a UN organization)

References

External links 
 ICS Home page

International organisations based in London
Organisations based in the City of London
Shipping trade associations